Tiaan Henk Swanepoel (born 4 June 1996) is a Namibian rugby union player for the  in Super Rugby . His regular position is fly-half or fullback.

He signed for the Lions Super Rugby side for the 2020 Super Rugby season.

References

Namibian rugby union players
Living people
1996 births
Rugby union fly-halves
Rugby union fullbacks
Lions (United Rugby Championship) players
Western Province (rugby union) players
Golden Lions players